John Harington, 1st Baron Harington (1281–1347) of Aldingham in Furness, Lancashire, was an English peer, created Baron Harington by writ of summons to Parliament dated 1326.

Origins
John Harington (alias de Haverington) was born in 1281 in Farleton, Melling, the son of Sir Robert de Haverington (died 1297), of Harrington in Cumbria, by his wife Agnes de Cansfield (died 1297), heiress of Aldingham in Furness, Lancashire. Agnes was the daughter and heiress of Richard de Cansfield by his wife Aline de Furness (alias de Fleming), heiress of Muchland (alias Michelland) in Furness, that is to say a moiety of the manor of Furness which had its caput at Aldingham. Muchland was held from the Abbot of Furness Abbey, who held the other moiety of Furness from the Earl of Lancaster.

Career
He was a minor at his father's death in 1297 and between 1297 and 1302 he was in wardship to Sir William de Dacre. He was knighted on 22 May 1306 and was summoned to military service in October 1309 when he accompanied Edward, Prince of Wales on a trip to Scotland. Upon leaving the military in March 1335, he became involved with his local council and later became a member of English Parliament in 1326 until his death in 1347. He held the manors of Aldingham, Thurnham, and Ulverston in Lancashire and Witherslack and Hutton Roof in Westmorland, with further estates in Austwick and Harrington in Cumberland.

Marriages and children

According to Findagrave # 71719420, John married twice: 
 First to Margaret de Barlingham (died 1307) having issue:
 Robert Harington (1305–1334) who predeceased his father.
 John Harington (b.1307). Margaret died during his birth.
 Secondly to Joan de Dacre by whom he had one child:
 Joan Harington (b. 1330)

He married a certain "Joan", probably a member of the Dacre family, by whom he had children including:
Sir Robert Harington (1305–1334), eldest son and heir apparent, knighted before 1331, who predeceased his father, having in about 1327 married Elizabeth de Multon (born 1306), daughter of Thomas de Multon and one of the three sisters and co-heiresses of John de Multon. She was the heiress of several estates including: Thurston in Suffolk; Moulton, Skirbeck and Fleet in Lincolnshire, of Egremont in Cumbria and of manors in County Limerick, Ireland. He left a son, heir to his grandfather:
John Harington, 2nd Baron Harington (1328–1363)

Death and burial
He died on 2 June 1347 at Aldingham and was buried in Cartmel Priory, formerly in Lancashire, now in Cumbria, where survives his monument with effigies of himself and his wife.

Further reading
Atkinson, Rev. J.C., The Coucher Book of Furness Abbey, Printed from the Original Preserved in the Record Office, London, Part 1, London, 1886

Sources

References

1281 births
1347 deaths
John
People knighted at the Feast of the Swans
13th-century English people
14th-century English people
Barons Harington